Bocage is a type of French countryside.

Bocage may also refer to:
 Villers-Bocage, Calvados, a commune in Northern France
 Manuel Maria Barbosa du Bocage (1765–1805), Portuguese poet
 Bocage (actor) (1801–1862), French actor
 José Vicente Barbosa du Bocage (1823–1907), Portuguese zoologist and politician
 Angela Bocage (b. 1959), American comics artist